The Port of Brăila is one of the largest Romanian river ports. Located in the city of Brăila on the Danube river, the port is an important source of revenue for the city because many large international companies have established there.

The shipbuilding industry is a key activity of the port and Norwegian and Romanian companies are the most important enterprises established there.

References

External links

Ports and harbours of Romania
Port